The ME3 carriers commonly refer to three Middle East airlines which use a hub and spoke model:
Emirates, an airline based in Dubai, United Arab Emirates
Etihad Airways, an airline based in Abu Dhabi, United Arab Emirates
Qatar Airways, an airline based in Doha, Qatar

References

Airlines of Asia